Achir or Ashir is an ancient city in Algeria, first capital of the Muslim dynasty of the Zirids, under Fatimid suzerainty, located at an altitude of 4,593 feet in the Titteri Mountains, in the current Algerian commune of Kef Lakhdar (Wilaya of Médéa).

The city is mentioned by Ibn Khaldun who indicates that Mount Tetri is the kingdom of the Zirids, in which the ruins of Achir are located. Archaeological excavations have determined the existence of two Zirid sites in this area.

History 
The eponymous of the Berber Sanhaja dynasty, Ziri ibn Menad, who inherited the domination over Ifriqya, had been the Fatimid faithful and active lieutenant. In their struggles against Abu Yazid's soldiers and against the Zenetas, who dominated west of Tiaret, his interventions had been decisive. Thus, the Fatimid Caliph al-Qaim had authorized him to affirm his young power by the construction, in 935–36, of a capital that served as a stronghold and store on the slopes of Jebel Lakhdar at Ain Boucif.

The French historian Georges Marçais, who researched the remains of the Zirid constructions on the spot, showed that they reveal the progress of the founder of the dynasty.

Achir quickly gained importance. Situated in an ideal geographical position for a capital, on the natural border separating the plains of the western Tell from the Kabyle mountains of the east, he commanded the road that climbed the coast, following the ridges, and watched over the nomads of the plain. His rise received the encouragement of the Fatimid Caliph. Ziri brought people from other towns, perhaps also undesirables who were not safe elsewhere, and then surrounded it with thick walls. At the beginning of the eleventh century, Al Bakri reports that 'it is ensured that in the whole region there is no place that is stronger, more difficult to take and more likely to discourage the enemy, because ten men are sufficient to defend it.

An impregnable place, but also a place of active exchanges between Tell and the steppe, an intellectual center where forensic scientists and scholars flocked, Achir was truly a capital with Ziri as sovereign who commanded the most formidable contingents, watched over the central Maghreb from the top of his belvedere and minted coins in his name.

Achir was the heart of Sanhajian power. Thus, when the Caliph's sudden success made the Zirids masters of Ifriqiya, they abandoned their capital only with regret. It was little by little that the emirs took their families to the new capital, loosened the bonds that attached them to Achir and made their former domain a march entrusted to their relatives, until the day it escaped them. The Zirid success in the new capital was a source of great regret.

When the Fatimid Caliph Al-Mu'izz left the Maghreb for Egypt in 972, he entrusted the administration of Ifriqya to Ziri's son Bologhin. This one leaves Achir to settle in Kairouan, but he will keep close links with Achir where his family will remain.

Later, Achir and his region will be entrusted to the Hammadids and when the Hammadids declare their independence from the Zirids, they will incorporate it, after the 1017 arrangement, into their domain. Achir will be much coveted and she will change masters several times.

In 1048, Yusuf Ibn Hammad takes it and plunders it; in 1076, the Zenatas occupy it. Retaken in 1101 by Tachfine ben Tinamer, the master of Tlemcen, the city was devastated,

It is rebuilt before being occupied again, this time by Ghazi al-Sanhaji (1184). From this period on, one does not hear any more about Achir, which, in any case, has lost its role as capital for several years already.

The archaeological site 
According to Lucien Golvin, a French academic who undertook excavations on the site in 1954, Achir is composed of two distinct cities. Achir or Yachir, the capital of Ziri and Benia, built later by his son Bologhine, 2 km further south.

References

Former populated places in Algeria
Medieval Algeria
Archaeological sites in Algeria
Zirid dynasty